Sunnhordland Arbeiderblad was a Norwegian newspaper, published in Stord in Hordaland county.

Sunnhordland Arbeiderblad was started in 1946 as the Communist Party of Norway organ in Sunnhordland. It had a predecessor in Sunnhordlands Kommunistblad, which existed from 1927 to 1928. Sunnhordland Arbeiderblad went defunct already in 1947. It resurfaced from 1951 to 1955.

References

1946 establishments in Norway
1955 disestablishments in Norway
Communist Party of Norway newspapers
Defunct newspapers published in Norway
Mass media in Hordaland
Norwegian-language newspapers
Odda
Publications established in 1946
Publications disestablished in 1947
Publications established in 1951
Publications disestablished in 1955